The Anhalt Barn is a historic barn in rural eastern Logan County, Arkansas. It is located west of New Blaine, near the junction of Old Military and Artesian Well Roads. 

It is a -story timber-frame structure with a gabled roof and a tall fieldstone foundation, laid out as a double crib with a central drive.

Built in 1878 by George Henry Anhalt, a German immigrant, it is the county's only known barn based on German barn-building principles.

It was listed on the National Register of Historic Places in 1993.

See also
National Register of Historic Places listings in Logan County, Arkansas

References

Barns on the National Register of Historic Places in Arkansas
Buildings and structures completed in 1878
Buildings and structures in Logan County, Arkansas